Geoffrey N. Cantor (born 1943) is Emeritus Professor of the History and Philosophy of Science at the University of Leeds and Honorary Senior Research Associate at UCL Department of Science and Technology Studies at University College London. He has written about Michael Faraday, the wave theory of light and the responses of the Quaker and Jewish religions to science. With John Hedley Brooke he delivered the 1995–1996 Gifford Lecture at the University of Glasgow, which were subsequently published as Reconstructing Nature: The Engagement of Science and Religion  in 1998. He contributed to the SciPer Project, which researches the popularization of science in the periodicals of the 19th century, such as the Boy's Own Paper and Punch, and has lectured upon this subject at the Royal Institution in 2005.

Selected works

 Quakers, Jews, and Science: Religious Responses to Modernity and the Sciences in Britain, 1650-1900, Oxford University Press, 2005, 420 pages
 Science Serialized: Representation of the Sciences in Nineteenth-century Periodicals, edited with Sally Shuttleworth, MIT Press, 2004, 358 pages
 Science in the Nineteenth-century Periodical: Reading the Magazine of Nature, edited with Gowan Dawson, Graeme Gooday, Cambridge University Press, 2004, 329 pages
 Reconstructing Nature: Engagement of Science and Religion, authored with John Hedley Brooke, Continuum International Publishing Group, 2000, 450 pages
 Michael Faraday, authored with David Gooding, Prometheus Books, 1996, 111 pages
 Michael Faraday: Sandemanian and Scientist : a Study of Science and Religion in the Nineteenth Century, St. Martin's Press, 1991, 359 pages
 Optics After Newton: Theories of Light in Britain and Ireland, 1704-1840, Manchester University Press, 1983, 257 pages

References

External links
University of Leeds staff

1943 births
Living people
Academics of the University of Leeds
British historians
British philosophers
Historians of science